The Great Southern Football League is an Australian rules football league based in the state of Western Australia, incorporating teams from towns located within the Great Southern region. The league was formed in 1991 after an amalgamation of the Southern Districts (Denmark, Royals, North Mt Barker, North Albany, Railways, South Mt Barker) and Central Great Southern Football League (Australs, Kojonup, Tambellup, Wanderers, Dumbleyung) Leagues in 1991. All but Denmark and Dumbleyung formed teams in the initial season of the league. There are currently 6 teams covering all tiers of the league.

Current clubs

Previous clubs

Grand final results

Derbies 
Current Derbies
Railways and Royals. (Cross street rivals.)
Denmark/Walpole and Mt Barker. (Small town rivalry)
North Albany and Royals (Red & Whites vs Blue & Whites has always been the traditional since the SDNFL days).

Previous Derbies
Australs and Wanderers. (Small town rivalry)
North Mt Barker Demons and South Mt Barker Hawks. (Small town rivalry)

References 

Australian rules football competitions in Western Australia